is a Japanese manga series written and illustrated by Mikio Igarashi. It was serialized in the Enix magazine Monthly Shōnen Gangan from 1995 to 1999. A 48-episode anime adaptation was produced by Shin-Ei Animation, directed by Tetsuo Yasumi, and broadcast on TV Asahi between July 5, 1997, and March 28, 1998.

The official English name is Manmaru The Ninja Penguin.

Characters

Anime
The anime uses two pieces of theme music.  by Yumi Adachi is the series' opening theme while  by Miho Komatsu is the series' ending theme.

Staff
Written by: Mikio Igarashi
Chief animation director: Sueyoshi Yuuitirou
Art Director: Nakamura Takashi
Director of Photography: Itou Syuuiti
Editing: Okayasu Tadashi
Recording Director: Good Kobayashi Takashi
Music: Ootani Akihiro, Norio Ido
Producer: Kazi Makoto (TV Asahi), Tetsuya Watanabe (Dentsu), Katou Yoshio (SHIN-EI)
Director: Yasumi Tetsuo
Screenplay: Clear Yamazaki Department, Yasumi Tetsuo, Taeko Okina, Yonemura Shiyouzi, Houzyou Tika, Masaaki Sakurai, Takumi Kusube
Animation: String Dream House, Dream Tai Company
Original: Last House, the same Yangurujimu
Videos: Yangurujimu same
Check Video: Hara Yoshi, ORENGE, Kurokawa Shiyouiti
Color Design: Sanae Matsutani
Special Effects: Doi Mitiaki, Yamamoto Hiroshi, Hara Makiko, Hashizume Satoshi two, Doi Atsushi, Sachiko Harada, Sachie relationship
Title: Akira Michikawa
Squirrel Mask: Maki Productions
Coloring: Imaizumi Hiromi, Yoko Miyamoto, Maruta Noriko, Anzai Naomi, Matsuo Megumi
Finish: Lightfoot, Killy Studio, Studio M Trace
Production Cooperation: Vega Entertainment
Background: Uni Studios
Photography: Asahi Production
Digital Effects: Hirotaka Humi youngest student Kazumi Akira
Editing: Okayasu Tadashi, T. Kojima, Murai Hideaki, Kei Takashi Miyake, Yumiko middle, Hiroshi Kawasaki Akira
Developing: Toukyou processing station
Effect: Yokoyama Masakazu
Recording Studio: APU Studio
Voicing: Tanaka Yoshiaki
Assistant voicing: Yamamoto Takuo
Sound Production: Audio Planning You
Sound Production Desk: Hana good food plant
Assistant Producer: Itikawa Yoshihiko (SHIN-EI)
Literature: Takumi Kusube
Production Desk: Kashihara Kenzi
Production Progress: Mabuti Yoshikiti, H. Ishida, Huruhata Shiniti, Naoki attached, Yamamoto Haruko, a Takeshi Mita, S. Uchida, Takei Takeshi
PR: Kaori Suzuki (Asahi)
Production Cooperation: Dentsuu
Production: TV Asahi, SHIN-EI

Video Game 
In 1997, a 3D action game based on Ninpen Manmaru was released for the Sega Saturn, developed by TamTam and published by Enix Corporation.

References

External links

1995 manga
1997 anime television series debuts
1998 Japanese television series endings
Anime series based on manga
Comedy anime and manga
Animated television series about penguins
Gangan Comics manga
Shin-Ei Animation
Shōnen manga
Square Enix franchises
TV Asahi original programming
Winners of the Shogakukan Manga Award for children's manga